Vollmersweiler is a municipality in the district of Germersheim, in Rhineland-Palatinate, Germany.

Location 
The village is located in the southern Palatinate between Karlsruhe and Landau. Since 1972 the community has belonged to the Kandel municipal association, whose administrative headquarters is in the town of Kandel.

History 
Vollmersweiler once belonged to the lords of Guttenberg castle. For a time in the 18th century it shared a Schultheiß with the town of Niederotterbach on the west.

Religion 
In 2007, 50% of the population was Protestant and 24.8% Catholic. The remainder belonged to a different religion or none.

Government 
The council consists of seven council members, including the Mayor. It was elected in municipal elections on June 13, 2004. Elvira Oberle (SPD) has been Mayor of  since 1991.

Coat of arms 
The blazon of the arms is: In red a slanting silver plowblade.

References

External links 

Vollmersweiler

Germersheim (district)